Middleburg is an unincorporated area and census-designated place (CDP) within Clay County in the U.S. state of Florida, located  southwest of downtown Jacksonville and  northwest of Green Cove Springs, the county seat of Clay County. As of the 2020 census,the population of Middleburg was 12,881.

It is home to Middleburg High School and to the Middleburg Historic District.

Geography
Middleburg is located northwest of the center of Clay County at  (30.050783, -81.902013). Florida State Road Blanding Boulevard leads northeast  to the Orange Park area and southwest  to Keystone Heights.

Demographics

As of the census of 2010, there were 13,008 people living in 4,891 housing units within the CDP. Between the 2000 and 2010 census, Middleburg realized a population increase of 2,670 individuals. The racial makeup of the CDP was 92.9% White, 3.1% African American, 0.6% Native American, 0.7% Asian, 0.0% Pacific Islander, 0.9% from other races, and 1.8% from two or more races. Hispanic or Latino of any race were 4.1% of the population.

In the CDP, the population was spread out, with 24.87% under the age of 18, 75.13% age of 18 or over, and 10.36% age of 65 or over. The population is 49.7% female and 50.3% male.

History

Early settlement
First settled as a village in the early decades of the nineteenth century, Asa Clark ran the first ferry on Black Creek until 1828, leading to the settlement being called Clark's Ferry. 

Between 1824 and 1827, the Federal Military Road was constructed, running south from Colerain, Georgia to Tampa Bay. The Federal Military Road passed through Clark's Ferry along the route of present-day Main Street, resulting in increased traffic through the community and providing a postal route. 

Blakey (1976) wrote of a settlement called Whitesville which existed approximately near the intersection of present-day Florida State Road 21 and County Road 218, and which grew large enough to warrant its own United States Post Office, established on February 19, 1828. That same year, Isaac Boring founded the Black Creek Methodist Church, although the frontier Methodist society met in their own homes until the Methodist United Church was built in 1847. 

John Hanson took ownership of Clark's ferry from 1828 through 1833, whereafter he sold to Samuel and Charlotte Garey, resulting in the area coming to be known as Garey's Ferry. George Branning also operated a separate ferry, which competed with Garey's, around this time.

Forts Heileman and Sanderson
The community expanded rapidly during the Second Seminole War. Fort Heileman, a wooden stockade fortification located between the North and South prongs of Black Creek, was hastily built in 1836 and protected settlers at Garey's Ferry where it was the "principal depot for the east coast of Florida."

During the Seminole Wars, Fort Heileman was used as a quartermaster workshop and storage depot until its armaments were moved to Fort Shannon in Palatka and the fort was largely abandoned after June 18, 1841. The Fort was permanently abandoned in 1842 and destroyed by a flood later that year. The only potential remnant of Fort Heileman is the Clark-Chalker House, which was built in 1835 and may have served as Fort Heileman's army hospital.

Fort Sanderson was built around July 12, 1840 at an unknown location in Garey's Ferry, but was mostly used for storage, and was abandoned the following year (Blakey, 1976).

Creation of Middleburgh, Seat of Clay County
Garey's Ferry expanded following the Seminole Wars, growing quickly and trading in timber, citrus fruits, cotton, and farm crops. In 1851, Garey's Ferry and Whitesville were consolidated into the town of Middleburgh and the Post Office moved from Whitesville to its current location on Palmetto Street. Clay County (named for Henry Clay) was created from Duval County in December 1858, and Middleburgh became and remained the county seat until 1874.
Throughout the 1850s, as national tensions leading to the American Civil War were increasing, Middleburgh and Clay County remained a stronghold of Whig voters and pro-Union sentiment; in 1859, Whitesville residents renamed their community Webster in honor of Whig politician Daniel Webster.

American Civil War
On October 23, 1864, during the American Civil War, the 4th Massachusetts Volunteer Cavalry engaged local Confederates in a skirmish from their base at the Magnolia Springs hotel. Moving into Middleburg the next day, October 24, 1864, the 4th Massachusetts raided and set fire to downtown Middleburg on Main Street and Thompson (now Wharf) Street, destroying Samuel B. Thompson's cotton warehouses and docks, as well as a hotel. The 2nd Florida Cavalry, under command of Captain J.J. Dickison, retaliated by firing on the Massachusetts regiment, leading the latter to retreat across Black Creek and burn the ferry bridge behind them. As the Massachusetts regiment rushed back to Magnolia Springs, Dickison's regiment detoured four miles through Whitesville and caught the Massachusetts regiment at Jeremiah Halsey's Plantation, engaging in a skirmish that resulted in twelve Union deaths and Confederate victory. This skirmish is known officially as the Battle of Halsey's Plantation, but has also been referred to as the Battle of Big Gum Creek. The exact location of Halsey's Plantation is not known, but it was near the site that is currently Shadowlawn Elementary School on County Road 218.

Among the repeated skirmishes between the 4th Massachusetts and 2nd Florida cavalries was a two-hour engagement whereby Dickison's troops rescued cattle that had been seized by Union troops, which local history refers to as the Battle of the Tiger Head.

Decline and expansion
Middleburg suffered from the Civil War, after which there were less than 100 residents. Middleburg's population numbered in the 700s between 1890 and 1920. The Great Freeze of 1895 in and a reduction of the river trade further contributed to the town's decline.

In the 1890s, African American homesteaders, starting with Grant Forman (1868-1951) in 1895, settled and developed the community of Hill Top in what is Forman Circle." According to "Embedded in Clay," Forman fled to South Carolina after his house was burned by a white mob. Frosard Budington, a leader of Whitesville, covered the cost of Forman's land taxes until such time as it was safe for Forman to return to Hill Top.

The 1989 film, Brenda Starr, was partially filmed on Black Creek. 

Since the 1990s, Middleburg's population and industry have rapidly expanded along with the surrounding communities of Orange Park, Lakeside, Lake Asbury, Fleming Island, and Jacksonville. Because of this development, construction to extend the First Coast Expressway through the area is underway, including the addition of exit junctions in Middleburg, Green Cove Springs, and Asbury Lake.

Notable people

 Gary Barnidge, NFL tight end
 Lenny Curry, mayor of Jacksonville, Florida
 Roy Geiger, USMC World War II general
 Ashley Greene, actress
 Richard Owens, NFL tight end
 Donnie Van Zant, musician for 38 Special, Van Zant
 Johnny Van Zant musician for Lynyrd Skynyrd, Van Zant
 Slim Whitman, country singer and songwriter

Bands
The Red Jumpsuit Apparatus, rock band

References

Census-designated places in Clay County, Florida
Census-designated places in the Jacksonville metropolitan area
Census-designated places in Florida
Former county seats in Florida